Juan Pedro Bordaberry Herrán (born 28 April 1960) is a Uruguayan attorney, lecturer and politician, who served as a Senator of the Republic from 2010 to 2020, as Minister of Tourism and Sports from 2003 to 2005, and as Minister of Industry, Energy and Mining from 2002 to 2003. A member of the Colorado Party, he was the party's candidate for president in the 2009 and 2014 presidential elections.

Early life and education 
Juan Pedro Bordaberry Herrán was born on April 28, 1960 in Montevideo, the fourth child of Juan María Bordaberry Arocena and his wife, Josefina Herrán Puig. His father, who was of Basque descent, was elected president in 1971, and in 1973 led a self-coup d'état, dissolving the General Assembly and starting the civil-military dictatorship. His great-grandfather, Domingo Bordaberry, served as a senator and rancher. His great-grandfather, Santiago Bordaberry (born Jaques Bordaberry) was an immigrant from the French Basque Country who arrived in Uruguay in the second half of the 19th century.

Pedro Bordaberry attended primary school at St. Andrews School, and secondary school at The British Schools and John XXIII Institute. He enrolled at the University of the Republic, from which he graduated in 1986 with a law degree.

Political career
Bordaberry began his career in public service as National Director of Industrial Property, reporting to the Minister of Industry and Energy from 1992 to 1994. In 2000 he was appointed Undersecretary of Tourism by President Jorge Batlle, and served as Minister of Tourism and Sports from 2003 to 2005. In the 2005 municipal elections, he was a candidate for Intendant of Montevideo, obtaining 26% of the vote, compared to 56% for the Broad Front candidate, Ricardo Ehrlich.

Some time after his defeat in the municipal elections, Bordaberry left the Lista 15 faction, and in 2007 he founded the Vamos Uruguay faction.

2009 presidential campaign 

In 2009, Bordaberry was selected as the Colorado Party's candidate for the Presidential election.

On 21 March 2009, Bordaberry was formally accepted as Presidential candidate for Vamos Uruguay at a ceremony in a stadium in Montevideo attended by an estimated 7,000 supporters. In June 2009, Bordaberry paused his work for the legal practice at which he had been active to focus on the Presidential campaign.

In June 2009, Bordaberry was publicly criticised by Colorado Party colleague Luis Antonio Hierro López, a previous ministerial colleague also running for President, due to his surname. In a muted response, Bordaberry noted that Hierro had previously campaigned for Bordaberry as colleagues in government, and had previously been silent about Bordaberry's family background.

In the Presidential vote on 26 October, Bordaberry won 17%, finishing behind the National Party and Broad Front candidates, but increasing the Colorado Party's share of the vote. He endorsed Luis Alberto Lacalle for the second round run-off vote that took place at the end of November 2009.

2014 presidential campaign 
On November 9, 2013, Bordaberry officially launched his presidential campaign for the 2014 presidential primaries. He hired campaign advisers who had worked for Bill Clinton and Barack Obama.

On June 1, 2014, he prevailed in the Colorado Party primary election election with 73.62% of the votes, against Senator José Amorín Batlle and former Senator Manuel Flores Silva. In the general election of October, he was in third place with 12.89%, behind Tabaré Vázquez and Luis Lacalle Pou; however, he was re-elected to the Senate.

Senate career
Bordaberry was elected to the Uruguayan Senate in 2009. In early 2010 Bordaberry called for the establishment of a new university in the interior city of Durazno, with a view to assisting disadvantaged potential students.

In 2017, Bordaberry said that he would not run again for President or Senator in 2019. After the 2019 presidential primaries in which Ernesto Talvi was confirmed as the presidential candidate of the Colorado Party, and in which the newly created Open Cabildo party obtained a high percentage of right-wing votes, several politicians and the media began to speculate on a possible new candidacy of Bordaberry for the Senate, to avoid a drain of Colorado votes in the general election. However, he withdrew after much opposition from party authorities.

Political positions

Economic issues 
Following the inauguration of the Obama Administration in the U.S., Bordaberry said that Uruguayan business leaders seeking to export their goods to the U.S. would encounter a greater degree of protectionism from U.S. officials. In August 2009, in the context of continuing, difficult relations with Argentina over trade issues, Bordaberry expressed strong reservations about the Mercosur trade pact, arguing that the Chilean model of pursuing bilateral trade pacts would be preferable for Uruguay.

Political image

Pedro Bordaberry's decision to seek a political base in Montevideo contrasts with his father, dictator Juan Maria Bordaberry, who had a long association with rural affairs. Juan Maria Bordaberry was arrested in 2006 in connection with the 1976 assassination of two legislators, Senator Zelmar Michelini and House leader Héctor Gutiérrez, and Pedro Bordaberry has since then been vocal in his support. Despite his own family history of dictatorship, Bordaberry has at several occasions accused former President José Mujica of being, or striving to become a dictator.

Bordaberry sometimes participates in outdoor public meetings on horseback, or in traditional "gaucho" horseriding attire. He has also contributed to literary criticism of the Argentinian writer Jorge Luis Borges, writing on Borges's theme of the complexity of memory.

Sport activity 
Bordaberry is a major figure in rugby union in Uruguay, and has been president of the Uruguayan Rugby Union. On 21 August 2018, FIFA appointed a "normalisation committee" for the Uruguayan Football Association (AUF). Bordaberry was put in charge, alongside politician Armando Castaingdebat, and former professional association football player Andrés Scotti.

Personal life 
He married the psychologist and psychotherapist María José Oribe in 1985. The couple has three children: Pedro, Agustín and Matías.

References

External links
Photograph of Pedro Bordaberry's motorcade, Carpinteria, Durazno, 20 September 2008

1960 births
Candidates for President of Uruguay
Children of presidents of Uruguay
Colorado Party (Uruguay) politicians
Living people
Members of the Senate of Uruguay
Ministers of Industries, Energy and Mining of Uruguay
Ministers of Tourism and Sport of Uruguay
People from Montevideo
Rugby union in Uruguay
20th-century Uruguayan lawyers
Uruguayan people of Basque descent
Uruguayan male writers
People named in the Panama Papers
People educated at The British Schools of Montevideo